Shaurya (English: Valour) is a 2008 Indian film. Shaurya may also refer to
Shaurya (name)
 Shaurya (missile), an Indian hypersonic surface-to-surface tactical missile
Shaurya Chakra, an Indian military decoration
Shaurya Smarak, a war memorial in Bhopal, India
Shaurya Aur Suhani, and Indian TV show 
Shaurya Aur Anokhi Ki Kahani, an Indian television drama series